Jack Donovan (17 January 1908 – 12 December 1964) was  a former Australian rules footballer who played with Footscray and North Melbourne in the Victorian Football League (VFL).

Notes

External links 
		

1908 births
1964 deaths
Australian rules footballers from Victoria (Australia)
Western Bulldogs players
North Melbourne Football Club players